Jim Sheasgreen is a Canadian politician and the former mayor of Fort Saskatchewan, Alberta.

Biography
Sheasgreen was born and raised in Montreal, Quebec.

Sheasgreen holds a Bachelor of Arts, Bachelor of Education and master's degree in Educational Administration. He was the superintendent of schools in Falher, Alberta, and Fort Saskatchewan from 1985 to 1998. He was the deputy superintendent for Elk Island Catholic Schools from 1998 to 2003.

Sheasgreen was first elected to political office in 2001 as a Fort Saskatchewan city councillor.

In 2004, he defeated incumbent mayor Ken Hodgins by earning 63.4% of the popular vote in the two-candidate mayoral race. He had no challengers in the 2007 municipal election and was acclaimed.
 
In 2010, Sheasgreen was defeated by Gale Katchur. One-term councillor Katchur earned 54.8% of the vote in the two-candidate mayoral race.

Sheasgreen is married to Christine Sheasgreen. They have three children: Kelly-Ann, Jennifer and Jim Jr.  Since being defeated in the 2010 election, Sheasgreen has been spending time with family and catching up on personal reading.

External links
 City of Fort Saskatchewan biography

References

Anglophone Quebec people
Living people
Mayors of Fort Saskatchewan
Politicians from Montreal
Year of birth missing (living people)
21st-century Canadian politicians